The Qadis District is located in the southern part of Badghis province, Afghanistan, between the districts Jawand in the east, Qala i Naw in the west, Muqur and Bala Murghab in the north. In the south is the Herat province. The capital is Qadis.

The Firozkhoi tribe of the Aimaq people once occupied the area.

Qadis was also the epicentre of the 2022 Afghanistan earthquake, which killed 28 people.

References

Districts of Badghis Province